Moothakunnam is a small village in the Paravur Taluk, Ernakulam district of Kerala, South India.

See also
North Paravur

References 

Villages in Ernakulam district
Suburbs of Kochi